The Evil Dead is a 1981 horror film and a franchise of sequels and other media.

The Evil Dead or Evil Dead may also refer to:
 Evil Dead II, a 1987 horror film of the same franchise
 Army of Darkness, a 1992 horror film, informally called Evil Dead 3
 Evil Dead (2013 film), a film starring Jane Levy
 Evil Dead Rise, an upcoming film starring Alyssa Sutherland and Lily Sullivan
 Evil Dead (musical), a musical based on the film

Video games
 The Evil Dead (video game), 1984
 Evil Dead: Hail to the King, 2000
 Evil Dead: A Fistful of Boomstick, 2003
 Evil Dead: Regeneration, 2005
 Evil Dead: The Game, 2022

Other uses
 Robert Bruce (rapper) (born 1970), American rapper and wrestler (wrestling stage name: Evil Dead)
 Evildead, an American thrash metal band
 "Evil Dead", a 1987 song by Death from Scream Bloody Gore

See also
 Ash vs Evil Dead, an American comedy horror television series